Sarah Bernhardt is a Lucky Luke adventure written by Xavier Fauche and Jean Léturgie and illustrated by Morris. It was the first Lucky Luke story by these script writers after René Goscinny's death. It was originally published in French in the year 1982 and by Cinebook in English in 2017. The plot features real-life actress Sarah Bernhardt.

Plot

In 1880 French actress Sarah Bernhardt plans a visit to the United States. U.S. President Rutherford Hayes asks Lucky Luke to protect her during her tour against the league for virtue and especially against the wife of the US president.

Characters 
 Sarah Bernhardt: (1844-1923), French theater actress
 George: Traitor in the team, later revealed to be Hayes' wife, Lucy, in disguise, jealous of Sarah

Historical background

Bernhardt indeed visited the United States in 1880.  The story that certain preachers warned people against her debauchery is also authentic, as is the plot element were Bernhardt posed on top of a dead whale in Boston to have her picture taken. In the story Bernhardt quotes the first lines from the poem Le Vase Brisé (The Broken Vase) by Sully Prudhomme.

Adaptations

The story was also adapted as an episode of the animated series Lucky Luke, but instead of Bernhardt it used a fictional singer and actress.

Sources

Comics by Morris (cartoonist)
Lucky Luke albums
1981 books
Cultural depictions of Sarah Bernhardt
Cultural depictions of Rutherford B. Hayes
Fiction set in 1880